Robert McLendon (November 24, 1936 – March 9, 2022) was an American politician who served as a member of the Arizona House of Representatives. McLendon served nine terms in the House from January 1983 through January 2001, representing district 5. The amendment to the Arizona Constitution which limited politicians to serving four consecutive terms in either house was passed in 1992, after he had already served five terms. McLendon died on March 9, 2022, at the age of 85.

References

1936 births
2022 deaths
People from Eastland County, Texas
People from Yuma, Arizona
Democratic Party members of the Arizona House of Representatives
20th-century American politicians